The 1895 Utah gubernatorial election was held on November 3, 1895. It was the first gubernatorial election in the state of Utah and it was held before it became a state on the 4 of January, 1896, to set up the machinery for the new state. Republican Heber Manning Wells defeated Democratic nominee John Thomas Caine with 50.32% of the vote. Wells' first term was to run for five years, until the next general election in 1900. Also, Populist Henry W. Lawrence ran but only won 4.95% of the vote.

General election

Candidates 

 Heber Manning Wells, Republican
 John Thomas Caine, Democratic

Results

See also 
 Utah Territory
 1900 Utah gubernatorial election

References

External links 
 
 

1895
Utah
Gubernatorial